"Mi Buen Amor" is a song by Chilean singer Mon Laferte featuring Spanish singer Enrique Bunbury. It was released on August 8, 2017 through Universal Music Group as part of Laferte's fifth studio album La Trenza. The song was written by Laferte, produced by herself and Manuel Soto.

Background
The song originally created by Mon Laferte for band Los Ángeles Negros, but since they could not record it for reasons of time and given the work it had taken to create this song, Laferte decided to record it and had the collaboration of the Spanish singer Enrique Bunbury.

Music video 
The music video shows Laferte in shots of her Amárrame Tour, especially as she passes through South America, through Chile, Argentina, Peru and Colombia, and is dedicated to her fans, as expressed by the artist herself on her Facebook Live: "We were recording shots of this tour, especially from South America, we visited Colombia, we went to Chile, Peru, Argentina. And the most shots that appear in this video are from that tour, from South America, and for me it is very nice to be able to thank you for all the love you have given us, how you have received us in each place. That's why we wanted to make this video like that. It is a gift for you and a way to thank you for everything you have given us". As January 2020, the music video has over 289 million views on YouTube.

Personnel 
Credits adapted from La Trenza liner notes.

Vocals

 Mon Laferte – lead vocals
 Juanes – lead vocals
 Esván Lemus – background vocals
 Jerry Velásquez – background vocals
 René Mooi – background vocals

Musicians

 Fermín Fortiz – bass guitar
 Ram – clarinet
 Enrique Lara – guitar
 Juanes – guitar
 Manuel Soto – guitar, organ
 Juan Molina – percussion
 Felipe Sanabria – saxophone
 Erick Rodríguez – trombone
 Humberto Sanabria – trumpet

Production

Manuel Soto – production
Eduardo del Águila – mixing, recording
Alan Ortiz – recording
Chalo González – recording
Dave Poler – recording

Charts

Weekly charts

Year-end charts

Certifications

References

2017 songs
2017 singles
Mon Laferte songs
Songs written by Mon Laferte